Viachaslau Saldatsenka (born 23 July 1994) is a Belarusian handball player for HC Meshkov Brest and the Belarusian national team.

He competed at the 2016 European Men's Handball Championship.

References

External links

1994 births
Living people
Belarusian male handball players
People from Orsha
Expatriate handball players
Belarusian expatriate sportspeople in Germany
Belarusian expatriate sportspeople in Romania
Handball-Bundesliga players
Sportspeople from Vitebsk Region